Emmet is the name of some places in the U.S. state of Wisconsin:

Emmet, Dodge County, Wisconsin, a town
Emmet, Marathon County, Wisconsin. a town
Foster, Eau Claire County, Wisconsin, formerly called Emmet